Quercus semiserrata is an Asian species of trees in the beech family Fagaceae. It has been found in northeastern India, Bangladesh, Myanmar, Thailand, Yunnan, and Tibet. This species is a component of tropical wet foothill forests in northern Myanmar and can also be found in montane forests, often at elevations of 1200 - 1600 meters above sea level. It is placed in subgenus Cerris, section Cyclobalanopsis.

Quercus semiserrata is a small tree up to 10 meters tall. Leaves can be as much as 7 cm long, thin and papery.

References

External links
line drawing, Flora of China Illustrations vol. 4, fig. 385, drawings 4 + 5 at lower left

semiserrata
Flora of Asia
Plants described in 1832